Friedhelm Eronat (born 1953, Prien, Germany) is a Geneva-based British centimillionaire business leader mainly involved in oil trading, exploration and production. Eronat is one of the world's most successful oil dealmakers. His estimated wealth is over $100m (£55m), built on deals in places such as Nigeria, Russia and Kazakhstan.

The son of Anna and Josef Eronat, Friedhelm Eronat studied production management and oil engineering at Nicholls State University in Louisiana, graduating in early 1970s. He then entered the international oil business. In 2003, Friedhelm Eronat renounced his United States citizenship and became a British citizen.

References

1953 births
Living people
German businesspeople
British businesspeople
People who renounced United States citizenship
Businesspeople from Geneva